The Colline Metallifere, or the Metalliferous Hills ("Metal-bearing Hills"), are a mountain-hill group in the Tuscan Antiapennine, in central Italy. They occupy the central-western part of Tuscany, divided between the provinces of Livorno, Pisa, Siena and Grosseto.

The territory, with the exception of the Poggio di Montieri and Cornate di Gerfalco peaks, both above the 1,000 m, is mostly hilly, with a rich variety of minerary resources, whence the name. It also includes geothermic energy sources, part of which used in ENEL power plants at Larderello and Lago Boracifero. Rivers include the Cecina, the Cornia and the Merse.

The metal resources of the Colline Metallifere were exploited since ancient times by the Etruscans. Production reached its peak in the mid-19th century, declining quickly however afterwards. The numerous railways serving the mills are now mostly suppressed.


Communes

Province of Livorno
Sassetta
Campiglia Marittima
Suvereto

Province of Pisa
Monteverdi Marittimo
Pomarance
Castelnuovo di Val di Cecina

Province of Siena
Radicondoli
Chiusdino

Province of Grosseto
Monterotondo Marittimo
Montieri
Roccastrada
Massa Marittima
Gavorrano
Scarlino
Castiglione della Pescaia

External links

Mountains of Tuscany
Mountain ranges of Italy